Ladislav Pavlovič (8 April 1926 – 28 January 2013) was a Slovak football player. He played for Czechoslovakia national team in 14 matches and scored two goals.

He was a participant at the Euro 1960, where he played in five matches and scored a goal in a match against France.

Pavlovič played mostly for Tatran Prešov (1950-1953, 1956-1965/66: 150 goals) and also briefly for CH Bratislava (1954-1955: 14 goals), giving him a total of 164 league goals in 345 games.

References

External links

  Ladislav Pavlovič family tree
  ČMFS entry

1926 births
2013 deaths
Slovak footballers
Czechoslovak footballers
1960 European Nations' Cup players
Czechoslovakia international footballers
1. FC Tatran Prešov players
FK Inter Bratislava players
Sportspeople from Prešov
Association football forwards